Portuguese-language literature can be:

 Angolan literature
 Brazilian literature
 Latin American literature
 Portuguese literature